Two lavishly illustrated illuminated manuscript psalters are known as the Psalter of Saint Louis (and variants) as they belonged to the canonized King Louis IX of France. They are now in Paris and Leiden, and are respectively good examples of French Gothic and English Romanesque illumination.

Paris
The Paris Psalter of St. Louis (Bibliothèque nationale de France MS Latin 10525) was made for Louis sometime between the death of his mother Blanche of Castile in 1253 and his death in 1270.  Done in the elaborate Rayonnant style and richly gilded, the manuscript contains 78 miniatures of Old Testament scenes starting at the story of Cain and Abel and ending with the coronation of Saul, a calendar of feast days, prayers and the 150 psalms.  The psalter is in excellent condition and considered a relic of Louis IX, who was canonized in 1297.

Leiden
The Leiden St Louis Psalter, (Leiden, University Library: BPL 76A), was originally produced for  Geoffrey Plantagenet, Archbishop of York, probably in northern England in the 1190s.  It is in Latin, with some inscriptions added in French, on parchment, with 185 folios, 24,5 x 17,7 cm. in size, 23 miniatures and historiated initials.

This manuscript passed into the hands of Blanche of Castile after Geoffrey's death, and, as religious manuscripts often were, was used to teach the future saint King Louis IX how to read as a child, as a 14th-century inscription below the Beatus initial (illustrated right) records.  After the king's death it passed through a number of royal owners, including the Valois Dukes of Burgundy, being regarded as a relic of the saint, before reaching the University Library at Leiden in 1741.<ref>Nigel Morgan, A Survey of Manuscripts Illuminated in the British Isles, Volume 4: Early Gothic Manuscripts, Part 1 1190–1250, Harvey Miller Limited, London, 1982, pp. 61–62.</ref>

Notes

 Bibliography 

 Günter Haseloff, Die Psalterillustration im 13. Jahrhunderts.: Studien zur Geschichte der Buchmalerei in England, Frankreich und den Niederlanden. Inaugural-Dissertation, Georg August Universität zu Göttingen, 1938.
 Victor Leroquais, Les psautiers, manuscrits latins des bibliothèques publiques de France.  Mâcon, Protat frères, 1940–41.
 Robert Branner, Manuscript painting in Paris during the reign of Saint Louis : a study of styles. Berkeley: University of California Press, 1977.
 Harvey Stahl, Picturing kingship. History and painting in the Psalter of Saint Louis.'' University Park, Pa., Pennsylvania State University Press, 2008.

Illuminated psalters
Manuscripts of Leiden University Library
Bibliothèque nationale de France collections
Louis IX of France